Durban City Hall is a historic city hall located at Durban in KwaZulu-Natal, South Africa.

History 
The building was designed by architect Stanley G. Hudson and erected between 1906 and 1910.

Description 
The building, which features an Edwardian neobaroque style, is almost an exact replica of Belfast City Hall in Northern Ireland. The façades are decorated by allegorical statues depicting the arts, music, literature, commerce and industry.

Gallery

See also 
 List of heritage sites in KwaZulu-Natal

References

External links
 
 

Durban
Buildings and structures in Durban